Deran Toksöz (born 21 May 1988) is a German footballer who plays as a midfielder for Oberliga Hamburg club TSV Sasel.

Career
Toksöz made his professional debut in the 3. Liga for Holstein Kiel on 21 September 2013, starting against MSV Duisburg before being substituted out in the 14th minute for Manuel Hartmann due to a tactical change following a red card in the 11th minute by Kiel defender Marcel Gebers.

Personal life
Born in Germany, Toksöz is of Turkish descent.

References

External links
 Profile at DFB.de
 
 FC Bergedorf 85 statistics at Fussball.de
 FC St. Pauli II statistics at Fussball.de
 Holstein Kiel II statistics at Fussball.de

1988 births
Living people
Footballers from Hamburg
German footballers
German people of Turkish descent
Association football midfielders
VfL Bochum II players
FC St. Pauli II players
Holstein Kiel players
Holstein Kiel II players
FC Teutonia Ottensen players
3. Liga players
Regionalliga players
Oberliga (football) players
FC Eintracht Norderstedt 03 players